Tasi (Greek: Τάσι) is an old neighbourhood in the city of Patras.  It is located close to the castle in the modern upper city.  During the Frankish rule, it contained a square named Tasso.  During the Ottoman rule, the area around the square and the neighbourhood of Tasi (an alterration of Tasso) was destroyed. Then the  square became the centre and the city market.  There it had all of its trade shops of the city.  Today, it conjectures that the neighbourhood and the square is located in the present neighbourhood of Pantokratora.

References
 Δ. Καρατζά, Χ. Χαραλάμπους, Δ. Γκότση, Γ. Λύρα, Πάτρα, ονομάτων επίσκεψις, Έκδοση των εφημερίδων Εθνικός Κήρυξ των Πατρών και Ημερήσιος Κήρυξ των Πατρών, Πάτρα 1995 (in Greek)

Note
The first version of the article is translated and is based from the article at the Greek Wikipedia (el:Main Page)

Neighborhoods in Patras